Platycentropus is a genus of northern caddisflies in the family Limnephilidae. There are at least three described species in Platycentropus.

Species
These three species belong to the genus Platycentropus:
 Platycentropus amicus (Hagen, 1861)
 Platycentropus indistinctus (Walker, 1852)
 Platycentropus radiatus (Say, 1824) (chocolate and cream sedge)

References

Further reading

 
 
 

Trichoptera genera
Articles created by Qbugbot
Integripalpia